The  is a river in western Kōchi Prefecture, Japan. 196 km in length, it has a watershed of 2,270 km². Its name is written with kanji meaning "forty thousand and ten".

Since the river is remote from major cities and does not have any dams, it is sometimes referred to as "the last clear stream of Japan". Fishing and production of nori is a thriving industry along the river. It has been named one of the "Three Free-Flowing Rivers in Japan", along with the Nagara River in Gifu Prefecture and the Kakita River (柿田川 Kakita-gawa) in Shizuoka Prefecture.

The river also has 47 chinkabashi (沈下橋 lit. 'sinking bridge'), including those of tributaries. Chinkabashi are low water crossings constructed without parapets in order not to be washed away by floods. The prefecture decided to preserve them as cultural heritage.

See also
Yoshino River, which has similar low water crossings

External links

Rivers of Kōchi Prefecture
Rivers of Japan